Kirklington and Edingley railway station was a railway station serving the villages of Edingley and Kirklington in Nottinghamshire, England.

History

The station opened in 1871 when the Midland Railway opened a line from Southwell to Mansfield.

Shortly after opening the timetable comprised 3 trains from Mansfield to Lincoln per day, and 4 trains from Lincoln to Mansfield.

The station closed to passengers on 12 August 1929  when the Mansfield to Southwell section, which passed through a mining area closed to passengers in 1929. The railway replaced it with a road motor omnibus service provided in conjunction with the Mansfield and District Tramways Limited connecting with the railway stations between Mansfield and Newark. Freight services continued until 25 May 1964. The station and platform remain.

Stationmasters
John Bettinson 1871 - 1891
Albert Ernest Whitworth 1892 - 1926

References

Disused railway stations in Nottinghamshire
Railway stations in Great Britain opened in 1871
Railway stations in Great Britain closed in 1929
Former Midland Railway stations